Dom Luís I (31 October 1838 – 19 October 1889), known as the Popular (Portuguese: o Popular) was King of Portugal from 1861 to 1889. The second son of Queen Maria II and her consort, King Ferdinand, he acceded to the throne upon the death of his elder brother King Pedro V. He was a member of the ruling House of Braganza

Reign

Luís was a cultured man who wrote vernacular poetry, but had no distinguishing gifts in the politics into which he was thrust by the death of his older brother Pedro V in 1861. Luís's domestic reign was a series of transitional governments called Rotativism formed at various times by the Progressistas (Liberals) and the Regeneradores (Conservatives), the party generally favoured by King Luís, who secured their long term in office after 1881. Despite a flirtation with the Spanish succession prior to the Franco-Prussian War of 1870–71, Luís's reign was otherwise one of domestic stagnation as Portugal fell ever further behind the nations of western Europe in terms of public education, political stability, technological progress and economic prosperity. In colonial affairs, Delagoa Bay was confirmed as a Portuguese possession in 1875, whilst Belgian activities in the Congo and the 1890 British Ultimatum prevented the Portuguese from colonizing modern-day Botswana in order to establish a link between Portuguese Angola and Portuguese Mozambique at the peak of the Scramble for Africa.

Personal interests
Luís was also very keen with literature, not only with books in Portuguese but also in English. He was the first to bring fully translated Shakespearean works to Portugal, such as The Merchant of Venice, Richard III and Othello, the Moor of Venice. His best-known work in Portugal was his translation of Hamlet.

Marriages and descendants

In June 1862, Luís asked Archduchess Maria Theresa of Austria (1845–1927), a daughter of Archduke Albert, Duke of Teschen and Princess Hildegard of Bavaria, to marry him in a letter sent to her father. It was urgent for him to get married as his older brother, King Pedro V, had died in November 1861, without issue and two of his younger brothers, João and Fernando, followed him shortly after, which left the Braganza dynasty almost without heirs. Luís had already selected a number of brides including Princess Marie of Hohenzollern-Sigmaringen (1845-1912), sister of his late sister-in-law Stephanie, Duchess Sophie Charlotte in Bavaria (1847-1897), Princess Maria Pia of Savoy (1847-1911) and also considered some Austrian archduchesses, Maria Theresa being one of them, but didn't know which one to choose. So he sent letters to his cousin, Queen Victoria, and his great-uncle, King Leopold I of Belgium, to ask for their advice. Both agreed that the best choice was Maria Theresa. Thus, King Luís sent his letter. However, his wish was not fulfilled as her father, Archduke Albert, thought she was too young at the time (she was one month away from turning 17) and needed to finish her education. Two weeks after, Luís asked for the hand of Princess Maria Pia of Savoy and, this time, was accepted, even though Maria Pia, born in 1847, was even younger than Maria Theresa.

Luís married Maria Pia, the daughter of Victor Emmanuel II of Italy and Maria Adelaide of Austria, on 6 October 1862. They both had a deep love at first, but Luis's countless mistresses led Maria Pia to depression. Together they had two sons who survived childhood.

 Dom Carlos, Prince Royal of Portugal (28 September 1863 – 1 February 1908), successor as King Carlos I; murdered by the Carbonária.
 Dom Afonso, Prince Royal of Portugal (31 July 1865 – 21 February 1920), Infante of Portugal, Duke of Porto, Viceroy of India, and after 1908 Prince Royal.
 Miscarriage (1866)

The King also fathered one illegitimate son, also named Carlos Augusto, who was born in 1874 in Lisbon.

Honours 
He received the following orders:

Ancestry

References

|-

1838 births
1889 deaths
Portuguese infantes
House of Braganza-Saxe-Coburg and Gotha
Princes of Saxe-Coburg and Gotha
Dukes of Porto
19th-century Portuguese monarchs
Burials at the Monastery of São Vicente de Fora
People from Lisbon
People from Cascais
Constables of Portugal
3
3
3
Knights Grand Cross of the Order of the Immaculate Conception of Vila Viçosa
Extra Knights Companion of the Garter
Knights of the Golden Fleece of Spain
Grand Crosses of Naval Merit
Grand Crosses of Military Merit
Laureate Cross of Saint Ferdinand
Recipients of the Order of the Netherlands Lion
Recipients of the Order of the White Eagle (Russia)
Recipients of the Order of St. Anna, 1st class
Grand Crosses of the Order of Saint Stephen of Hungary
Knights Grand Cross of the Order of Saints Maurice and Lazarus
Recipients of the Order of the Cross of Takovo
Knights of Malta
Recipients of the Order of the Medjidie, 1st class
Grand Crosses of the Order of Saint-Charles
Grand Crosses of the Order of the Star of Romania
Grand Crosses of the Order of the Crown (Romania)